

See also

List of Sydney Harbour ferries
Transdev Sydney Ferries
Sydney Ferries
Murray River crossings
List of Hobart ferries

External links 
 Historical & contemporary Sydney ferries
 

Australia transport-related lists

Australia